The 1908–09 Scottish Division One season was won by Celtic by one point over nearest rival Dundee.

The end of the season was complicated by a high number of fixtures which still had to be played before the end of April 1909 due to postponements caused by replays in the Glasgow Cup the previous autumn, a situation made worse by the Scottish Cup final which also had to be replayed. Celtic, who were involved in both those finals, had to play their last eight league matches over a twelve-day period, winning five of these and drawing two to pull ahead of Dundee, who only played once in the same period.

League table

Results

References

1908–09 Scottish Football League
Scottish Division One seasons
Scottish